Bohumil Němeček (2 January 1938 – 3 May 2010) was a Czechoslovak welterweight boxer. He first trained in ice hockey, and changed to boxing only in 1955, winning Czech national titles in 1959 and 1960, an Olympic gold medal in 1960, and a European title in 1967. He also competed at the 1964 and 1968 Olympics, but in both cases was eliminated in the second round. After retiring as a participant, Němeček worked as a boxing coach and a bus driver. His health rapidly deteriorated after suffering a stroke in 2000, eventually resulting in death ten years later.

1968 Olympic results
Below is the record of Bohumil Němeček, a Czechoslovak welterweight boxer who competed at the 1968 Mexico City Olympics:

 Round of 64: bye
 Round of 32: lost to Ivan Kiryakov (Bulgaria) by disqualification in the third round

References
 Olympijský vítěz v boxu z Říma 1960 Němeček zemřel
 

1938 births
2010 deaths
Czechoslovak male boxers
Boxers at the 1960 Summer Olympics
Boxers at the 1964 Summer Olympics
Boxers at the 1968 Summer Olympics
Olympic boxers of Czechoslovakia
Olympic gold medalists for Czechoslovakia
People from Tábor
Olympic medalists in boxing
Medalists at the 1960 Summer Olympics
Czech male boxers
Light-welterweight boxers
Sportspeople from the South Bohemian Region